Norco Bicycles is a bicycle manufacturer founded in 1964 and headquartered in Port Coquitlam, British Columbia, Canada.

The company was founded by Bert Lewis and initially operated from a converted chicken coop in a rural area. Norco was one of the first manufacturers of ten-speed bicycles and helped popularize BMX cycling. By 2014 the company line consisted of over 125 models shipped worldwide.

Norco Factory Team

In 2022 the team consists of 24 riders, including
 Bryn Atkinson - DH Race/Slalom
 Gwendalyn Gibson - Cross Country
 Jill Kintner: DH Race/Slalom/Enduro/PT
 Peter Disera: Cross Country
 Ryan Leech: Trials/Tech Trails

References 

Mountain bike manufacturers
Vehicle manufacturing companies established in 1964
Cycle manufacturers of Canada
Port Coquitlam

Manufacturing companies based in British Columbia